Răzvan Horj (born 17 December 1995) is a Romanian professional footballer who plays as a defender for Liga I side Petrolul Ploiești.

Honours
CFR Cluj
Liga I: 2018–19

Petrolul Ploiești
Liga II: 2021–22

References

External links
 
 

1995 births
Living people
People from Maramureș County
Romanian footballers
Association football defenders
Liga I players
Liga II players
CFR Cluj players
FC Viitorul Constanța players
FC Voluntari players
FC Universitatea Cluj players
CS Gaz Metan Mediaș players
FC Petrolul Ploiești players
Nemzeti Bajnokság I players
Újpest FC players
Romanian expatriate footballers
Romanian expatriate sportspeople in Hungary
Expatriate footballers in Hungary